The Comebacks is a 2007 American satirical comedy film directed by  Tom Brady. This film is a parody of the clichés and plots of the sports film genre. In the UK, Greece, Finland, Australia and New Zealand this film is called Sports Movie. The movie was released to theaters on October 19, 2007.

Plot

Coach Lambeau Fields (David Koechner) is pathetic. He has the distinction of being the worst coach in the history of sports anyone can recall. A loser of enormous proportions, the incompetent and seemingly hopeless coach is convinced by fellow coach Freddie Wiseman (Carl Weathers) to return to the field for one last shot. Assuring his long suffering wife, Barb (Melora Hardin), that he will not ignore his family, Coach moves them to Plainfolk, Texas where he hopes to redeem himself and his reputation. Here he begins yet another attempt to improve his abysmal record – this time as the coach of the football team at Heartland State University. But he is saddled with a team of misfits – most of whom don't know the difference between a line of scrimmage and a line at the cafeteria.

Although the team and townsfolk are leery of the newcomer's approach, the Coach uses his unorthodox methods to whip this group of rag-tags into shape – both on and off the field. While the audience follows their winding road to the playoffs, the film pokes fun at the clichés and conventions of other sports flicks. The team does make progress, so much so that they actually make it to the South-Southwest Conference Championship at the 2nd Annual Toilet Bowl.

Facing their fiercest opponents yet and yearning to win the big game, The Comebacks face off with the Lone Star State Unbeatables. And as every great sports team has always done, The Comebacks use ingenuity and unorthodox measures in the final showdown where the best team win. The Comebacks are victorious, but Lambeau is subsequently knocked down in a surprise attack by a bus with Freddie driving it, who laughs manically as Lambeau is in pain. Lambeau groans in agony.

Cast
 David Koechner as Coach Lambeau Fields, the coach of the Heartland Comebacks
 Carl Weathers as Freddie Wiseman, the coach of the Lone Star State Unbeatables
 Melora Hardin as Barb Fields, the wife of Lambeau Fields
 Matthew Lawrence as Lance Truman, quarterback
 Brooke Nevin as Michelle Fields, the daughter of Lambeau Fields
 Robert Ri'chard as Aseel Tare ("uh-seel tah-ree", mispronounced by Coach Fields as "ACL tear"), running back 
 Noureen DeWulf as Jizminder Featherfoot, kicker
 Nick Searcy as Mr. Truman, Lance's father
 Jackie Long as Trotter, wide receiver
 Jesse Garcia as Jorge Juanson, receiver
 George Back as Buddy Boy, lineman
 Martin Spanjers as Randy Randinger, towel boy
 Jermaine Williams as iPod
 Jillian Grace as Maria Sharapova
 Chauntal Lewis as Freddy's Girl
Cameos
 Eric Christian Olsen as Foreign Exchange Student
 Andy Dick as Toilet Bowl Referee
 Dennis Rodman as Warden
 Bradley Cooper as Cowboy
 Dax Shepard as Sheriff
 Jon Gries as Barber
 Will Arnett as Mailman
 Kerri Kenney as Sports Judge
 Lawrence Taylor as himself
 Michael Irvin as himself
 Eric Dickerson as himself
 Stacy Keibler as All-American Mom, a character in the toilet bowl halftime show.
 Drew Lachey as All-American Dad, a character in the toilet bowl halftime show.
 Jason Sklar and Randy Sklar as Superfans
 Frank Caliendo as Chip Imitation

Reaction
On Metacritic, the film received a 25/100 rating from 13 reviews, meaning "generally unfavorable reviews". On Rotten Tomatoes, it has an approval rating of 9% and an average rating of 2.7/10 from 33 reviews.  The critical consensus reads: "Full of groin-centric humor and tired sports clichés, The Comebacks is poor even by parody movie standards."

Box office
The Comebacks had an opening weekend of $5.6 million at #5. At the end of its box office run, it grossed $13.3 million in the US and $139,173 in foreign countries.

References

External links
 
 
 

2007 films
Films directed by Tom Brady
20th Century Fox films
2000s sports comedy films
American football films
American parody films
American sports comedy films
Films scored by Christopher Lennertz
2007 comedy films
2000s English-language films
2000s American films